The falls of Edinample is a waterfall near the village of Craggan in the district of Stirling in Scotland.

See also
Waterfalls of Scotland

References

Waterfalls of Stirling (council area)